Of Love and Hunger is a novel by Julian MacLaren-Ross, first published in the United Kingdom in 1947 by Allan Wingate.

Plot summary 
Richard Fanshawe sells vacuum cleaners for a living and has an unhappy love affair with Sukie, the wife of his friend.

1947 British novels